The King Khalid Foundation is a non-profit established in Saudi Arabia in 2001 by the family of the late King Khalid, who ruled the country from 1975 until his death in 1982.

The Foundation was managed by the Director General, Princess Al Bandari bint Abdul Rahman Al Faisal from 2001 to 2019. From 2019 Nouf bint Mohammed has been serving in the post.

Overview
The Foundation is a royal, family-run organization and is managed by a Board of Trustees composed of a minimum of nine (9) and maximum of eleven (11) members. The Board of Trustees is the highest authority, which draws up the general policies and specifies the Foundation’s functions for the purpose of attaining its objectives and supervises its implementation.

See also

 List of things named after Saudi Kings

References 

House of Saud
2001 establishments in Saudi Arabia
Charities based in Saudi Arabia